MacPheat Park is an organized hamlet in the Rural Municipality of McKillop No. 220, Saskatchewan, Canada.

Government 
MacPheat Park has a three-member organized hamlet board, chaired by Doug Clark. The board reports to the Rural Municipality of McKillop No. 220 as its administering municipality.

References

External links 

McKillop No. 220, Saskatchewan
Organized hamlets in Saskatchewan
Division No. 6, Saskatchewan